Supun Madushanka (born 11 December 1993) is a Sri Lankan cricketer. He made his Twenty20 debut for Police Sports Club in the 2018–19 SLC Twenty20 Tournament on 15 February 2019. He made his List A debut for Police Sports Club in the 2018–19 Premier Limited Overs Tournament on 8 March 2019. He made his first-class debut for Police Sports Club in Tier B of the 2018–19 Premier League Tournament on 6 February 2019.

References

External links
 

1993 births
Living people
Sri Lankan cricketers
Sri Lanka Police Sports Club cricketers
Place of birth missing (living people)